The 2000 Wisconsin Fall General Election was held in the U.S. state of Wisconsin on November 7, 2000.  One of Wisconsin's U.S. Senate seats was up for election, as well as Wisconsin's nine seats in the United States House of Representatives, the sixteen even-numbered seats in the Wisconsin State Senate, and all 99 seats in the Wisconsin State Assembly.  Voters also chose eleven electors to represent them in the Electoral College, which then participated in selecting the president of the United States.  The 2000 Fall Partisan Primary was held on September 12, 2000.

In the Fall general election, the Democratic presidential candidate, Vice President Al Gore, narrowly won Wisconsin's eleven electoral votes, defeating Texas Governor George W. Bush by a mere 5,708 votes.  All nine of Wisconsin's incumbent members of Congress were reelected.  Democrats gained one seat in the Wisconsin Senate; Republicans gained one seat in the Wisconsin Assembly.

The 2000 Wisconsin Spring Election was held April 4, 2000.  This election featured a contested election for Wisconsin Supreme Court and the Presidential preference primary for both major political parties, as well as various nonpartisan local and judicial offices.  The 2000 Wisconsin Spring Primary was held on February 15, 2000.

Wisconsin Republicans celebrated the results of the April election with the victory of their preferred candidate in the Wisconsin Supreme Court election.  The Presidential preference primary was not seriously contested on either the Democratic or Republican side, as most candidates had already dropped out before Wisconsin's vote.

Federal offices

U.S. President

Incumbent Democratic President Bill Clinton was term-limited and was not a candidate for reelection.  In Wisconsin, voters chose Clinton's vice president, Al Gore, over Texas Governor George W. Bush.  Vice President Gore received Wisconsin's eleven electoral votes, but did not win the national electoral vote.

Results

| colspan="6" style="text-align:center;background-color: #e9e9e9;"| General Election, November 7, 2000

U.S. Senate

Incumbent Democratic U.S. Senator Herb Kohl was reelected to a third six-year term, defeating Republican John Gillespie.

| colspan="6" style="text-align:center;background-color: #e9e9e9;"| General Election, November 7, 2000

U.S. House

State offices

Legislature

State Senate
The 16 even-numbered seats in the Wisconsin State Senate were up for election in 2000.  Each party controlled 8 seats up for election in 2000, with Democrats holding a 1-seat majority in the full Senate, 17–16.  Republicans picked up one Democrat-held seat in the 2000 general election, but Democrats picked up two previously Republican-held seats, for a net result of the Democratic Party gaining 1 seat and increasing their majority to 18–15.

Summary

Candidates

State Assembly
All 99 seats in the Wisconsin State Assembly were up for election in 2000.  Republicans gained 1 seat in the 2000 general election, increasing their majority to 56–43.

Summary

Judiciary

State Supreme Court
Incumbent Wisconsin Supreme Court Justice Diane S. Sykes defeated Milwaukee municipal court judge Louis B. Butler in the April general election.  Justice Sykes had been appointed to the court in 1999 by Governor Tommy Thompson, to replace Justice Donald W. Steinmetz, who had retired.  Justice Steinmetz's term was already set to expire in 2000, thus no special election needed to be scheduled.

| colspan="6" style="text-align:center;background-color: #e9e9e9;"| General Election, April 4, 2000

State Court of Appeals
Three seats of the Wisconsin Court of Appeals were up for election in 2000.  None of the elections was contested.
 In District I, Judge Ralph Adam Fine was elected to his third six-year term.
 In District II, Judge Richard S. Brown was elected to his fourth six-year term.
 In District IV, Judge Margaret J. Vergeront was elected to her second six-year term.

State Circuit Courts
Forty nine of the state's 241 circuit court seats were up for election in 2000. One of those seats—in Waupaca County—was newly created by the 1999 budget act passed by the Wisconsin Legislature.  Eight of the seats were contested.  Only one incumbent judge was defeated seeking re-election, Michael G. Grzeca—an appointee of Governor Tommy Thompson in the Brown County Circuit.

Local

Milwaukee
 Incumbent Mayor John Norquist was reelected to a fourth four-year term, defeating businessman George Watts.

Monroe County
 Ed Thompson, brother of incumbent Governor Tommy Thompson, was elected Mayor of Tomah, Wisconsin, defeating incumbent Bud Johnson.

References

 
Wisconsin
Wisconsin State Legislature elections